William Herman Schaap (March 1, 1940 – February 25, 2016) was an American lawyer, co-founder of the CovertAction Information Bulletin, and director of the Institute for Media Analysis.

Life
He was born in Brooklyn to Maurice and Leah (née Lerner) Schaap. Dick Schaap was his older brother. He graduated from Cornell University, and from University of Chicago Law School in 1964. Most of Schaap's legal career was spent representing activists, protesters, and whistleblowers. He also advised conscientious objectors to the Vietnam War while working in Germany and Japan.

In 1976, he helped found CovertAction Information Bulletin, which was renamed the CovertAction Quarterly in 1992. Schaap was married to co-founder Ellen Ray.

Works

Books
Covert Action: The Roots of Terrorism, with Ellen Ray. New York: Ocean Press (2003). .
Bioterror: Manufacturing Wars the American Way, with Ellen Ray. New York: Ocean Press / Institute for Media Analysis, Inc. .

Articles
 "Half a Billion Allocated: The CIA Chooses a New Contra Leader." CovertAction Information Bulletin, no. 26 (Summer 1986). pp. 25–26. Full issue. 
 "The Modern Mithridates: Vernon Walters: Crypto-Diplomat and Terrorist." CovertAction Information Bulletin, no. 26 (Summer 1986), pp. 3–8. Full issue. 
 "Filipino Refugee Secretly Tapes CIA Recruiting Pitch," with Ellen Ray. CovertAction Information Bulletin, no. 39 (Winter 1991), pp. 58–62. Full issue.

Media 
CIA Covert Operations with William Schaap (2016). Interview by Our Hidden History.
MLK Assassination Trial: William Schaap Testimony on Govt. Disinformation (Nov. 30, 1999). Full transcript at The King Center.

References

External links
Transcript of interview with Phil Donahue on NBC (Oct. 26, 1981).
 Staff writer (Mar. 4, 2016). "Radical Lawyer, Author and Publisher William Schaap Dies" (obituary). Democracy Now! Archived from the original.

New York (state) lawyers
1940 births
2016 deaths
People from Brooklyn
Cornell University alumni
University of Chicago Law School alumni
20th-century American lawyers
21st-century American lawyers
American expatriates in Japan
American expatriates in Germany